The West Virginia High School Football State Championships have been held since the early 1900s.  The West Virginia Secondary School Activities Commission, WVSSAC began its formal recognition of WV State Football Championships in 1937 with the state's sports writers' vote.  The WVSSAC began a class system, dividing larger and smaller schools in 1947.  WVSSAC official playoff games began in 1948.  Prior to the WVSSAC's involvement in an official playoff, there were other systems in play.  From 1916 to 1955 the WVSSAC was called the West Virginia Athletic Association.

History

Getting started 
In the early 1900s, teams claimed state titles by virtue of their records against other WV schools.  Some of the major newspapers would have input as well.   Often coaches would contact one another and arrange championship games themselves.  This system may have been flawed, but it was what most WV schools used for at least 33 years.

Separate was not equal 
Before Brown vs. Board of Education in 1954, high school football was segregated just like the schools.  About 45 colored schools existed in WV.
More than 25 black school football programs existed in West Virginia during segregation.  In 1914, WV black leaders came together and formed what would become the West Virginia Athletic Union (WVAU), which would govern high school athletic championships in WV for the African American students.  The WVAU ceased to exist in 1956 as only two schools remained in the organization.

Private schools 
Prior to 1977 most private schools did not participate in the WVSSAC or its football playoff system.  Nearly all the private schools that fielded football teams were Catholic, so the WVCHSAA was formed.  In 1962 Catholic leadership began a championship game process for their schools.  The West Virginia Catholic State Football Champion was crowned until the 1976 season.  Wheeling Central Catholic joined the WVSSAC in 1970.  By 1977 the WVCHSAA numbers were so low the organization was dissolved.

WVSSAC takes the reins

Tie breakers 
Prior to 1965 season, games played against teams in a higher class were not considered in the point system if the smaller school lost.  Before 1976, if two teams tied for the last playoff spot they were both removed from the playoff.  This happened in 1963 when Charleston and Welch both tied for the #2 playoff position.  #1 Buckhannon-Upshur was awarded the AAA title without a game.  In 1975, in single A, both Meadow Bridge and Rivesville finished the regular season 10–0–0, but tied for the #4 playoff spot.  They were both eliminated and #1 Wirt was given a bye.  There is now a tie break system for teams whose playoff points average out the same.

Location 
Championship games were played in a variety of locations over the years, but that changed in 1979.  From 1979 to 1993 the three WV Football Championship games were played at Laidley Field, now University of Charleston Stadium at Laidley Field in Charleston.  The West Virginia State High School Football Championship games have been played at Wheeling Island Stadium since 1994.

Eras and classes 
The different eras of West Virginia State Football Championships are listed below:
A small number of West Virginia high schools sponsored football teams prior to 1900, but the first known game played between two West Virginia schools occurred in 1901 when Huntington High met Charleston High. The first claimed state title that has been discovered, so far, was Fairmont Senior in 1903.  It is not yet certain if state titles were claimed every season between 1903 and 1915.
1903–1915: Prior to WVSSAC or formal sportswriters vote: Single-class system, games arranged by individual teams, 1903 & 1907 Fairmont Senior.
1916–1936: WV Athletic Association (known as the West Virginia Secondary School Activities Commission after 1955) formed to help regulate high school athletics in WV.  State football champions were still selected by schools arranging games and sports writers' input.
1914–1956: Colored School State Champions.  Before the historic Brown vs. Board of Education Supreme Court ruling, in 1954, schools, and football games, were segregated. African Americans were forced to play in their own league.  The West Virginia Athletic Union governed African American athletics during this time.
1937–1946: Single-class system. Champion was named by the West Virginia Sportswriters Association.
1947–1954: Two-class system. Schools were placed in Class A or B based on enrollment.
1955–1957: Three-class system, with Class AA, Class A or B based on enrollment.
1958–present: Three-class system, based on enrollment, with Classes AAA, AA and A.

From 1947 to 1954, there were only two classes; Class A (big schools) and Class B (small schools).  From 1955 to 1957, there were three classes; Class AA (big schools), Class A (medium-sized schools) and Class B (small schools).  From 1958 to the present there have been three classes as well, however the names have been changed to: Class AAA (big schools), Class AA (medium-sized schools) and Class A (small schools).

Champions by popular acclaim

Single class 
(*school no longer exist)

During the 1926 season Williamson and Magnolia arranged a state title game.  Williamson defeated Magnolia 14–13.  However, after accusations on both sides of ineligible players the WVAA (now known as the WVSSAC) stepped in and forced both teams to forfeit all their games.  Doug Huff, one of WV's leading sports historians, left both schools in his book, History of Sports in West Virginia, so this author left them on this list as well.

Colored State Football Champions 
It is almost surreal to think that, not that many years ago, African American students were barred from playing football with White Americans.  This changed in 1954 with a Supreme Court decision, Brown vs. Board of Education, overturning school segregation.  The black school athletics were governed by the WV Athletic Union but did not receive as consistent media attention as their white counterparts.  This makes research difficult.  Information on the Colored State Football Champions has been provided by Robert Bonner, WV high school football researcher.  More will be entered as the information becomes available.

Single class 
(*school no longer exist)

WV Catholic Schools State Football Champions 
Prior to 1977, most Catholic schools did not participate within the WVSSAC.

Single class 
(*school no longer exist)

WV sports writers' vote

Single class 
(*school no longer exist)

Two-class system (A, B) 1947–1954 / WVSSAC Ratings 
The WVSSAC (WVAA at the time) used a power rating system to choose the state champions in a two-class system in 1947.  The WVSSAC started a playoff game system in 1948.  From 1948 to 1971, only the top two teams in each class went to the playoff.  In 1972 the playoff field was expanded to four teams.  In 1978 the playoffs were expanded to eight teams per class.  Finally, in 1991, the top 16 in each class were awarded a playoff spot.

Class A (two classes A, B, 1947–1954)

Class A champion selected using power rankings (1947) 
(*school no longer exist)

Class A two-team playoff (1948–1954) 
(*school no longer exist)

Class B (two classes A, B, 1947–1954)

Class B champion selected using power rankings (1947) 
(*school no longer exist)

Class B two-team playoff (1948–1954) 
(*school no longer exist)

Three-class system (AA, A, B) 1955–1957 / WVSSAC Ratings

Class AA (three classes AA, A, B, 1955–1957)

Class AA two-team playoff 
(*school no longer exist)

Class A (three classes AA, A, B, 1955–1957)

Class A two-team playoff 
(*school no longer exist)

Class B (three classes AA, A, B, 1955–1957)

Class B two-team playoff 
(*school no longer exist)

Three-class system (AAA, AA, A) 1958–present / WVSSA

Class A (three classes AAA, AA, A, 1958–present)

Class A two-team playoff (1958–1971) 
(*school no longer exist)

Class A four-team playoffs (1972–1977) 
(*school no longer exist)

When the 1975 football season ended, Meadow Bridge (10–0–0) and Rivesville* (10–0–0), were tied for the #4 playoff spot in Class A.  With no tie break rules, both were eliminated and #1 Wirt County received a bye in the semi-final round. The WVSSAC has since made a comprehensive tie break rule.

Class A eight-team playoffs (1978–1990) 
(*school no longer exist)

Class A 16-team playoffs (1991–2000) 
(*school no longer exist)

Class A 16-team playoffs (2001–2010)

Class A 16-team playoffs (2011–2020) 

In 2020 the COVID-19 epidemic effected the football season greatly.  Health officials developed a map, which was published each Saturday, and used to determine which counties could participate in WVSSAC activities the upcoming week.

Class A 16-team playoffs (2021–2030)

Class AA (three classes AAA, AA, A, 1958–present)

Class AA two-team playoff (1958–1971) 
(*school no longer exist)

Class AA four-team playoffs (1972–1977) 
(*school no longer exist)

Class AA eight-team playoffs (1978–1990) 
(*school no longer exist)

Class AA 16-team playoffs (1991–2000) 
(*school no longer exist)

Class AA 16-team playoffs (2001–2010)

Class AA 16-team playoffs (2011–2020) 

In 2020 the COVID-19 epidemic effected the football season greatly.  Health officials developed a map, which was published each Saturday, and used to determine which counties could participate in WVSSAC activities the upcoming week.

Class AA 16-team playoffs (2021–2030)

Class AAA (three classes AAA, AA, A, 1958–present)

Class AAA two-team playoff (1958–1971) 
(*school no longer exist)

Class AAA four-team playoffs (1972–1977) 
(*school no longer exists)

Class AAA eight-team playoffs (1978–1990) 
(*school no longer exist)

Class AAA 16-team playoffs (1991–2000) 
(*school no longer exist)

Class AAA 16-team playoffs (2001–2010) 

With 14 seconds remaining in the Hurricane vs. South Charleston quarter-final game, an on-field fight occurred.  This resulted in five South Charleston and four Hurricane players being ejected.  Ejection from a game results in a WVSSAC mandatory suspension from the next contest.  However, four of the South Charleston players' parents filed a lawsuit and a Kanawha County judge ruled the players could play in the semi-final game against Brooke.  After losing 29–28 to South Charleston, Brooke parents filed their own lawsuit in Brooke County, stating that South Charleston had used the ejected players illegally.  The AAA state title game was postponed one week while the case went to the Supreme Court of Appeals of West Virginia.  The Supreme Court of Appeals of West Virginia ruled the Kanawha County judge had overstepped her bounds and that the WVSSAC had final say in the matter.  South Charleston was forced to forfeit its game against Brooke.  Brooke then advanced to the AAA title game against Martinsburg.

Class AAA 16-team playoffs (2011–2020) 

In 2020 the COVID-19 epidemic effected the football season greatly.  Health officials developed a map, which was published each Saturday, and used to determine which counties could participate in WVSSAC activities the upcoming week.

Class AAA 16-team playoffs (2021–2030)

Schools with multiple football championships 
(*school no longer exist)
63 schools have won multiple Football Championships, 32 of which have since been consolidated. Parkersburg High School has won the most titles, with 17.  Wheeling Central Catholic has also won 17 state titles, five of which were Catholic State Championships.

Schools with one football championship 
(*school no longer exist)
There are 37 WV schools that have one state football championship.  Of those 37 schools, 21 have been closed or consolidated into new schools.

Runners-up 
(*school no longer exist)

WVSSAC State Football Champions

See also 
West Virginia Secondary School Activities Commission
WVSSAC Super Six Football Championships
Four Seasons Football  Historical High School Football Results for WV & VA

References

External links 
West Virginia Secondary School Activities Commission – Football

Sports in West Virginia